Sacco and Vanzetti: The Anarchist Background is a 1991 history book by Paul Avrich about Sacco and Vanzetti with a special emphasis on anarchist sources.

References

External links 

 
 

1996 non-fiction books
American history books
Books by Paul Avrich
English-language books
History books about anarchism
History books about the United States
Princeton University Press books
Works about Sacco and Vanzetti